Ratarda is a genus of moths in the family Cossidae.

Species
 Ratarda excellens (Strand, 1917) (originally in Shisa)
 Ratarda flavimargo Hering, 1925
 Ratarda furvivestita Hampson
 Ratarda guttifera Hering, 1925
 Ratarda javanica Roepke, 1937
 Ratarda marmorata Moore, 1879
 Ratarda melanoxantha Hering, 1925
 Ratarda mora Hering, 1925

References

External links
Natural History Museum Lepidoptera generic names catalog

Ratardinae